Parliamentary elections were held in Greece on 4 January 1887. Supporters of Charilaos Trikoupis emerged as the largest bloc in Parliament, with 90 of the 150 seats. Following the election Trikoupis remained Prime Minister, having assumed office on 21 May 1886.

Results

References

Greece
Parliamentary elections in Greece
1887 in Greece
Greece
1880s in Greek politics
Charilaos Trikoupis